The Summer Bash is an annual event organised by the Rugby Football League. An entire round of Championship matches are played in a city to showcase the sport of rugby league. It has been held at Bloomfield Road, Blackpool since 2015.

Concept
The Summer Bash was introduced in 2015 after the success of the Super League Magic Weekend. It is an extra round for the Championship teams to compete in, usually a local derby. The event takes place over a single weekend in which three regular season games are played back-to-back on each day with an extra fourth game being played on the Saturday which is the final of the League 1 Cup.

History

2015: Blackpool

The games played were, when possible, 'local derby' matches in an attempt to maximise interest in the event. The "non-heartland" sides were paired against each other. An extra match on the Saturday, was the final of the inaugural League 1 Cup between North Wales Crusaders and Swinton.

2016: Blackpool

After a successful inaugural Summer Bash in Blackpool in 2015 it returned to Blackpool in 2016 with mostly local derbies being played apart from Bradford vs Leigh and Sheffield Eagles vs London Broncos not being geographical derbies and were based on league positions. Once again, the League 1 Cup final took place as the opening game to the weekend.

2017: Blackpool

The event returned to Blackpool's Bloomfield Road for a third consecutive year after the previous years record attendances. The Summer Bash once again opened with the League 1 Cup final.

2018: Blackpool
The event returned to Blackpool's Bloomfield Road for a fourth consecutive year after the previous years record attendances. The Summer Bash this year opened with a Women's Super League fixture.

2019: Blackpool
The event returned to Blackpool's Bloomfield Road for a fifth consecutive year.

2020: Blackpool
The 2020 Summer Bash was scheduled to return to Blackpool for a sixth consecutive year, however was cancelled due to the COVID-19 pandemic in the United Kingdom.

2021: Blackpool
The 2021 Summer Bash was also cancelled due to the COVID-19 pandemic in the United Kingdom. Fixtures were never released.

Team statistics

Venues

Attendances

Highest single day attendance

Lowest single day attendance

Highest weekend attendance

Lowest weekend attendance

See also

Magic Weekend
League 1 Cup

References

External links

Rugby Football League Championship
Annual sporting events in the United Kingdom
Sports leagues established in 2015
Rugby league competitions in the United Kingdom
2015 in English rugby league
Championship (rugby league)